Adrián Vallés Escortell (born 3 June 1986) is a Spanish race car driver.

Career
Vallés was born in Teulada, Alicante. After a strong karting career, he drove in Spanish Formula Three, before moving to the World Series by Nissan in 2004. The series was renamed World Series by Renault in 2005 while he continued in the series, finishing 2nd in the standings with two race wins. In 2006 he started racing in the GP2 Series with Campos Racing, and also tested for the MF1 Racing Formula One team on 19 September. The team was bought out by Spyker and on 30 January 2007 Vallés was named the team's official reserve driver.

He returned to GP2 for 2008, driving for the FMS International team in the GP2 Asia Series. He remained with the team for the first round of the 2008 GP2 Series season, but then switched to BCN Competicion. He elected to miss the final round of the season at Monza to focus on his sportscar commitments. Vallés returned to the GP2 Asia Series, by replacing Chris van der Drift (racing for A1 Team New Zealand at their home round of the 2008–09 A1 Grand Prix season at Taupo Motorsport Park) at Trident Racing for the third round of the season in Bahrain. Vallés and van der Drift would later team up to be the drivers for Epsilon Euskadi in the 2009 World Series by Renault season.

Additionally, Vallés has begun a sportscar career in 2008 with Epsilon Euskadi by driving in the 2008 24 Hours of Le Mans and the 2008 1000km of Silverstone.

He moved on to team management in 2013 with his AV Formula team entering the 2013 Formula Renault 3.5 Series season with Arthur Pic and Yann Cunha as their drivers.

Formula One
Adrian took part in testing at Silverstone in September 2006 testing for  team Spyker although at the time they were Midland F1. He tested for Spyker in 2007.

On 3 February 2010, the Spanish press said that Adrián Vallés could be the partner of Argentine driver José María López in the USF1 team. Later, the Spaniard would not reach an agreement when the American team went bankrupt even before it was created.

Superleague Formula
On 8 November 2009, Valles clinched the 2009 title with a solid fourth place for Liverpool in the final race of the season in Jarama.

Racing record

Career summary

Complete Formula Renault 3.5 Series results
(key) (Races in bold indicate pole position) (Races in italics indicate fastest lap)

Complete GP2 Series results
(key) (Races in bold indicate pole position) (Races in italics indicate fastest lap)

Complete GP2 Asia Series results
(key) (Races in bold indicate pole position) (Races in italics indicate fastest lap)

Superleague Formula
(key)

2008–2009
(Races in bold indicate pole position) (Races in italics indicate fastest lap)

2009 Super Final results
Super Final results in 2009 did not count for points towards the main championship.

24 Hours of Le Mans results

References

External links
 
 

1986 births
Living people
Sportspeople from Alicante
Spanish racing drivers
Motorsport team owners
Euroformula Open Championship drivers
GP2 Series drivers
24 Hours of Le Mans drivers
Superleague Formula drivers
GP2 Asia Series drivers
European Le Mans Series drivers
World Series Formula V8 3.5 drivers
Pons Racing drivers
Campos Racing drivers
Epsilon Euskadi drivers
Trident Racing drivers
De Villota Motorsport drivers
Scuderia Coloni drivers